Ian Andrew Greer  (born 16 April 1958) is a medical doctor who is the President and Vice Chancellor of Queen's University Belfast and formerly Vice-President of the University of Manchester and Dean of the Faculty of Medical and Human Sciences. He was Regius Professor of Obstetrics and Gynaecology at the University of Glasgow 2001−2007, Dean at Hull York Medical School 2007–2010, then Pro-Vice-Chancellor of the Faculty of Health and Life Sciences at the University of Liverpool 2010−2015.

Early life
Greer went to Allan Glen's School in Glasgow. He studied at the University of Glasgow graduating with a medical degree.

Academic career
In 1991, Greer joined the University of Glasgow as Head of the Department of Obstetrics and Gynaecology. He held the Muirhead Chair of Obstetrics and Gynaecology from 1992 until 2000. Taking up the post at the age of 33, he was the youngest person to be appointed professor and head of a British department of obstetrics and gynaecology in the 20th century. In 2001 he became Regius Professor of Obstetrics and Gynaecology.

Greer took up the post of Dean of the Hull York Medical School in January 2007. He moved to the University of Liverpool in 2010, becoming Pro-Vice-Chancellor of the Faculty of Health and Life Sciences. In 2013, he was made the Provost responsible for research policy. In early 2015, he was asked to head the Health North scheme which was concerned with eHealth and local innovation.

In March 2015 the University of Manchester appointed him as Vice-President and Dean to lead the Faculty of Medical and Human Sciences. Shortly after this he was named as director of the Manchester Academic Health Science Centre. Queen's University Belfast appointed him as President and Vice-Chancellor in January 2018 and he started in this role in August 2018.

In 2019 former US Secretary of State and Democratic Presidential Candidate Hillary Clinton was appointed the first female Chancellor of Queen’s.  

In July 2022 he completed a two year term as President of Universities Ireland, promoting collaboration and serving as the Chair of the Universities Ireland Board, which comprises all the Heads of each University on the island of Ireland.

In September 2022 he accepted the unanimous offer of the University Senate for a second term as President and Vice-Chancellor which will take his tenure up to 2030.

References

External links
 

1958 births
Living people
People educated at Allan Glen's School
Alumni of the University of Glasgow
20th-century Scottish medical doctors
21st-century Scottish medical doctors
Academics of the University of Glasgow
Academics of the University of Edinburgh
Academics of the University of Liverpool
Academics of the University of Manchester